Carry the Day is an American rock band from Torrance, California, formed in 2019. Consisting of vocalist and rhythm guitarist Christopher Huynh, bassist Luke Tazbier, drummer Brandon Saldana, and lead guitarist Isaac Vizcarra, the band released their debut single “Someone Else” on June 21, 2019 which amassed 100,000 Spotify streams in about a two month time period. Their second single “Better Days” released on August 9, 2019  landed on Spotify official playlists “New Punk Tracks” and “Pop Punk’s Not Dead” and has since gained 36,000 Spotify streams.
Following their single, they released their EP "Perspectives" on August 23, 2019.
Their releases have seen airplay from Rock Rage Radio’s “The Rock Goddess Radio Show” and “The Girl Next Door Radio Show” as well as RockWorld24.com. Combined their tracks have 142,000 Spotify streams and 11,399 monthly listeners counting within less than three months.

Track listing
All compositions by Carry the Day.
 "Someone Else" – 3:37

Personnel
Christopher Huynh – Vocalist, Rhythm Guitarist
Brandon Saldana – Drums
Luke Tazbier – Bass guitar
Isaac Vizcarra – Lead Guitar

References

Alternative rock groups from California
Musical groups established in 2019
2019 establishments in California